Zifeng Tower (Greenland Center-Zifeng Tower or Greenland Square Zifeng Tower, formerly Nanjing Greenland Financial Center) is a  supertall skyscraper (special class of skyscraper) in Nanjing, Jiangsu. The 89-story building completed in 2010 comprises retail and office space up to floor 41. Floors 49–71 feature a hotel, numerous restaurants, and a public observatory on the 72-floor. The tower's stepping is functional; office, hotel, and retail are located above grade, while the restaurants and the public observatory are housed at the top of the tower. The building is currently the tallest in Nanjing and Jiangsu province, the eleventh tallest in China and the twentieth tallest in the world.

Architectural firm Skidmore, Owings and Merrill designed the building, led by Adrian Smith. The Tower occupies an area of 18,721 square meters. The Nanjing Greenland InterContinental Hotel is located within the tower.

References

External links 

Skyscraper office buildings in Nanjing
Hotel buildings completed in 2010
Office buildings completed in 2010
Skidmore, Owings & Merrill buildings
2010 establishments in China
Retail buildings in China
Skyscraper hotels in Nanjing
Skyscrapers in Nanjing